Boswellia is a genus of trees in the order Sapindales, known for its fragrant resin. The biblical incense frankincense is an extract from the resin of the tree Boswellia sacra, and is now produced also from B. frereana.

Frankincense

The four main species of Boswellia, B. sacra (synonyms B. carteri and B. bhaw-dajiana), B. frereana, B. papyrifera, and B. serrata,  produce true frankincense, and each type of resin is available in various grades. The grades depend on the time of harvesting, and the resin is hand sorted for quality.

Description
Boswellia species are moderate-sized flowering plants, including both trees and shrubs, and are native to tropical regions of Africa  and Asia. The distributions of the species are primarily associated with the tropics. The greatest diversity  of species presently is in Africa and India.

The species are dioecious or hermaphroditic. The flowers may have four or five faintly connate but imbricate sepals with an equal number of distinct, imbricate petals. Also, the stamens, that may contain nectar discs, have distinct glabrous filaments that occur in one or two whorls and in numbers equaling or twice the number of petals; the tricolporate pollen is contained within two locules of the anthers that open longitudinally along slits. The gynoecium contains three to five connate carpels, one style, and one stigma that is head-like to lobed. Each locule of the superior ovary has two ovules with axile placentation that are anatropous to campylotropous. The one- to five-pitted fruit is a drupe that opens at maturity. The endosperm is usually lacking in the embryo.

The genus name honors Scottish botanist John Boswell, 1710–1780 (incidentally uncle of writer James Boswell).

Ecological status
In 1998, the International Union for Conservation of Nature (IUCN) warned that one of the primary frankincense species, Boswellia sacra, is "near threatened". Frankincense trees are not covered by the Convention on International Trade in Endangered Species of Wild Fauna and Flora, but experts argue that Boswellia species meet the criteria for protection. In a 2006 study, an ecologist at Wageningen University & Research claimed that, by the late-1990s, Boswellia papyrifera trees in Eritrea were becoming hard to find. In 2019, a new paper predicted a 50% reduction in Boswellia papyrifera within the next two decades. This species, found mainly in Ethiopia, Eritrea, and Sudan, accounts for about two-thirds of global frankincense production. The paper warns that all Boswellia species are threatened by habitat loss and overexploitation. Most Boswellia grow in harsh, arid regions beset by poverty and conflict. Harvesting and selling the tree's resin is one of the only sources of income for the inhabitants, resulting in overtapping.

Selected species

 B. ameero Balf.f.
 B. boranensis Engl.
 B. bricchettii (Chiov.) Chiov.
 B. bullata Thulin
 B. chariensis Guillaumin
 B. dalzielii Hutch.
 B. dioscoridis Thulin
 B. elegans Engl.
 B. elongata Balf.f.
 B. frereana Birdw.
 B. globosa Thulin
 B. hildebrandtii Engl.
 B. holstii Engl.
 B. madagascariensis Capuron
 B. microphylla Chiov.
 B. multifoliolata Engl.
 B. nana Hepper
 B. neglecta S.Moore
 B. odorata Hutch.
 B. ogadensis Vollesen
 B. ovalifoliolata N.P.Balakr. & A.N.Henry
 B. papyrifera (Del.) Hochst.
 B. pirottae Chiov.
 B. popoviana Hepper
 B. rivae Engl.
 B. ruspoliana Engl.
 B. sacra Flueck.
 B. serrata Roxb. ex Colebr. (type)
 B. socotrana Balf.f.
List source :

References

External links
Phytochemical Investigations on Boswellia Species
Boswellia Serrata
Chemotaxonomic Investigations on Resins of the Frankincense Species Boswellia papyrifera, Boswellia serrata and Boswellia sacra, respectively, Boswellia carterii: A Qualitative and Quantitative Approach by Chromatographic and Spectroscopic Methodology, Paul, M., Dissertation, Saarland University (2012)

 
Burseraceae genera